Diderma subasteroides is a species of slime mould in the family Didymiaceae, first described by Marie Leonore Farr in 1971. It  has been found in Africa, South America and Australia.

References

External links 
Description of Diderma subasteroides at DiscoverLife
Images for Diderma subasteroides at iNaturalist

Myxogastria
Taxa described in 1971
Taxa named by Marie Leonore Farr